is a professional Japanese baseball player who is a free agent. He previously played in Nippon Professional Baseball (NPB) for the Yomiuri Giants and Saitama Seibu Lions.

Career

Yomiuri Giants
Takagi made his Nippon Professional Baseball debut for the Yomiuri Giants on March 29, 2015. In his debut season, Takagi recorded a 9-10 record and 3.07 ERA in 27 games (26 of them starts). The following season, Takagi pitched in 25 games for Yomiuri, posting a 5-9 record and 4.31 ERA with 91 strikeouts in 117.0 innings of work. In 2017, Takagi made 16 appearances for the Giants, recording a 2.63 ERA with 15 strikeouts in 27.1 innings pitched.

Saitama Seibu Lions
On December 17, 2017, Takagi was selected by the Saitama Seibu Lions as compensation for Ryoma Nogami's departure in free agency. In 2018, Takagi struggled to an 8.69 ERA with 10 strikeouts in 8 appearances for the club. In 2019, Takagi made 2 appearances for Seibu, but allowed 2 earned runs in 2.1 innings pitched. Takagi became a free agent following the season.

On January 10, 2020, Takagi signed with the Leones de Yucatán of the Mexican League. Takagi did not play in a game in 2020 due to the cancellation of the Mexican League season because of the COVID-19 pandemic. On February 23, 2021, Takagi was released by the Leones.

Kanagawa Future Dreams
On March 12, 2021, Takagi signed with the Kanagawa Future Dreams of the Baseball Challenge League. On October 4, 2021, Takagi left the team.

Mexican League
On February 2, 2022, Takagi signed with El Águila de Veracruz of the Mexican League for the 2022 season. However, he did not make the Opening Day roster, and was later assigned to their affiliate team, the Algodoneros de San Luis of the Liga Norte de México. On May 25, 2022, Takagi was traded to the Rieleros de Aguascalientes of the Mexican League.

On July 14, 2022, Takagi was traded to the Bravos de León in exchange for IF Carlos Rivero. He was released on July 31, 2022.

References

External links

 NPB.com

1989 births
Living people
Baseball people from Mie Prefecture
Nippon Professional Baseball pitchers
Yomiuri Giants players
Saitama Seibu Lions players
Gigantes de Carolina players
Japanese expatriate baseball players in Mexico
Japanese expatriate baseball players in Puerto Rico
Rieleros de Aguascalientes players
Bravos de León players
Melbourne Aces players
Japanese expatriate baseball players in Australia